The Pacheco Stamping and Assembly is a Ford Motor Company automobile factory in General Pacheco, Argentina, opened in 1961, and spanning . As of 2018, the plant employed 3,500 workers.

Vehicles manufactured 
Since the plant opening in 1961:

Notes

See also
 List of Ford factories

References

External links

Ford factories
Motor vehicle assembly plants in Argentina